The canton of Souillac is an administrative division of the Lot department, southern France. Its borders were modified at the French canton reorganisation which came into effect in March 2015. Its seat is in Souillac.

It consists of the following communes:
 
Calès
Fajoles
Gignac
Lacave
Lachapelle-Auzac
Lamothe-Fénelon
Lanzac
Le Roc
Loupiac
Masclat
Mayrac
Meyronne
Nadaillac-de-Rouge
Payrac
Pinsac
Reilhaguet
Saint-Sozy
Souillac

References

Cantons of Lot (department)